Bouaflé is a city in central Ivory Coast. It is a sub-prefecture of and the seat of Bouaflé Department. It is also the seat of Marahoué Region in Sassandra-Marahoué District and a commune.

In 2021, the population of the sub-prefecture of Bouaflé was 213,967.

Villages
The 47 villages of the sub-prefecture of Bouaflé and their population in 2014 are:

References

Sub-prefectures of Marahoué
Communes of Marahoué
Regional capitals of Ivory Coast